Bouncing Babies is a 1929 Our Gang short comedy film directed by Robert F. McGowan. Produced by Hal Roach and released to theaters by Metro-Goldwyn-Mayer, it was the 92nd Our Gang short to be released.

Plot 
Wheezer is jealous of his baby brother, who gets all the attention from his family while Wheezer is ignored and expected to behave like a "big boy". After a failed attempt at making his own breakfast (and being spanked for doing so), Wheezer attempts to run away from home with Pete the Pup. After he happens upon Farina, they both find themselves on the receiving end of Halloween pranks from the gang in their costumes.

Farina tells Wheezer a tall tale about trading in an unwanted baby sibling for a goat and inspires Wheezer to try the same. However, when Wheezer arrives at the hospital with the baby carriage (which unknown to him holds Mary Ann's doll rather than the baby) in order to "change the baby for a goat," a nurse plays along, but also calls Wheezer's mother and informs her of what he has done. Wheezer's mother and his sister Mary Ann pretend to be distraught over the baby's disappearance.

After seeing his mother crying, a remorseful Wheezer rushes back to the hospital to retrieve his brother, but the nurse informs him that it is too late. Wheezer returns home alone, and his mother tells him to pray for the baby to return. Wheezer then drops to his knees and begins praying, only for the baby to come out of hiding and knock him on the head.

Cast notes 
Bouncing Babies marks the last Our Gang comedy for Jean Darling and Harry Spear. Some sources list also list Joe Cobb as a cast member, but he does not appear onscreen.

Cast

The Gang
 Norman Chaney as Chubby
 Jean Darling as Jean
 Allen Hoskins as Farina
 Bobby Hutchins as Wheezer
 Mary Ann Jackson as Mary Ann
 Harry Spear as Harry
 Pete the Pup as himself

Additional cast
 Jackie Cooper as Kid listening to Farina's story
 Bobby Mallon as Kid listening to Farina's story
 Dora Dean as Mrs. Dean, the mother
 Eddie Dunn as Eddie, the father
 Lyle Tayo as Nurse
 Tommy Atkins as Wheezer's little brother (unconfirmed)

See also 
 Our Gang filmography

References

External links 
 
 
 World Digital Library

American black-and-white films
American films about Halloween
Films directed by Robert F. McGowan
Hal Roach Studios short films
1929 comedy films
Our Gang films
1929 short films
1920s American films